Titchwell is a village and civil parish in Norfolk, England.

The villages name means 'Young goat spring/stream'.

At the 2011 Census the population remained less than 100 and is included in the civil parish of Thornham. For the purposes of local government, the parish falls within the district of King's Lynn and West Norfolk.

The village is noted for its RSPB reserve at Titchwell Marsh, an area of salt and freshwater marsh that extends along the coast towards Brancaster. It also has an Anglo Saxon church with an unusual spirelet.

There is a small nature reserve on the site of a former chalk pit, which is believed to have first been used in Roman times. In 1786, under the Inclosure Act of 1773, the land came into ownership of Titchwell Parish. After all the chalk had been removed, the land became a rubbish dump, which was soon closed following public outcry. Local farmers and Norfolk County Council then tidied the pit and planted trees and shrubs, creating a mini-reserve.

Titchwell used to have two pubs, but one of them, "The Three Horseshoes" has now been converted into apartments for the use of holidaymakers and investors. The village also has a 15th-century village cross at its centre, which would have been a marker point and meeting place for travellers and pilgrims.

The Church of England parish church, dedicated to St Mary, is a Grade I listed building. It is one of the 124 round-tower churches in Norfolk.

It also has two hotels, Briarfields and Titchwell Manor.

See also
Titchwell dispute
Paget Wilkes (1871 – 1934)

Notes

External links

Information from Genuki Norfolk on Titchwell.
St Mary's on the European Round Tower Churches website

Villages in Norfolk
King's Lynn and West Norfolk
Populated coastal places in Norfolk
Civil parishes in Norfolk
Beaches of Norfolk